Al-Sayyid or al-Sayed is a Bedouin village in Israel. Located in the Negev desert between Arad and Beersheba and just south of Hura, it falls under the jurisdiction of al-Kasom Regional Council.

History

The tribe's oral history tells that its first leader moved to the area from Egypt with his wife (of local origin) some time in the beginning of the 19th century. They settled amongst the other Bedouin tribes around Beersheba and lived off the land. However, other tribes refused to marry their daughters to the al-Sayyids, who were known as "the foreign fellahin." Eventually the head of the tribe managed to marry his sons to women from the Gaza area. However, their low social status meant that they continued to be rejected locally, and so the next generation began to marry cousins, a trend that continued for five generations. Even today other tribes continue to veto marriage ties with the al-Sayyids.

The social differences between the tribe and its neighbours led to opposition to plans to include the village within the municipality of the nearby city of Hura (that was established in 1989). Instead, the village was placed under the jurisdiction of Abu Basma Regional Council. It was officially recognized following Government Resolution 881 on 29 September 2003, which created eight new Bedouin settlements (seven of which were to be located in the Abu Basma Regional Council).

Demographics

Al-Sayyid is mainly populated by members of the al-Sayyid tribe, who are noted for the high levels of deafness amongst their population and their subsequent development of the al-Sayyid Bedouin Sign Language, which is used by many of the hearing villagers as well as the deaf. Five percent of the tribe (150 of the 3,000 as of 2004) are deaf, compared to a usual rate of 0.1%. One suggested cause is the high level of inbreeding within the tribe; 27% of marriages are between cousins, and 65% are between couples related in some way, and a quarter of the population carries the deafness gene. This is attributed to the tribe's historical isolation in the area. There is a presumption that a recessive gene for profound deafness is traced back to sons of the "founding" couple, two of whose five sons were deaf.

Infrastructure and public services
Since 2004, when the village was recognized, there was a significant infrastructure improvement. Several new school buildings were erected. Today there are three elementary schools and two high schools in al-Sayyid. The nearest university is Ben-Gurion University of the Negev in Beersheba.

Village residents receive medical service from medical clinic Leumit, there are additional medical clinics and  perinatal (baby) care centers Tipat Halav in a nearby township Hura.

Sign language
The phenomenon of an Al-Sayyid Bedouin Sign Language was first revealed in 1990 by anthropologist Shifra Kisch, and it became well known in 2005 when an international team of researchers from different universities, including University of Haifa, headed by Wendy Sandler started to study this unique sign language.
A journalist for The New York Times, Margalit Fox, wrote a book about it, called Talking Hands: What Sign Language Reveals About the Mind, published in 2007.

Gallery

See also
 Arab localities in Israel
 Bedouin in Israel
 Negev Bedouin
 Sedentarization

References

External links
Al-Sayyid Abu Basma Regional Council 
Al-Sayyid Bedouin Sign Language (ABSL) YouTube, December 2011
Lands of the Negev Israel Land Administration

Arab villages in Israel
Bedouin localities in Israel
Al-Kasom Regional Council
Populated places in Southern District (Israel)